Tkon is a municipality in Croatia in the Zadar County. According to the 2011 census, there are 763 inhabitants, 98% which are Croats.

It is located on the island of Pašman and is connected by ferry to the mainland town of Biograd na Moru.

History 

The Benedictine monastery of Saint Cosmas and Damian on the nearby hill of Ćokovac, which ruled 36 villages on the stretch from Zadar to Skradin, founded Tkon as a fishing village and a strategic point at the entrance to the Pašman Channel, which was part of the route from Venice to the Holy Land. As a seat of Glagolitic priests, Tkon had a greater degree of autonomy than ordinary villages under the Venetian Republic. Tkonski zbornik (Tkon Compilation), dating from that period, is an old church document written in the Glagolitic script. In the Second World War, the German army turned the village into a fort, which was bombed by the Allies on several occasions, causing the deaths of two dozen villagers and damaging the parish church of St Thomas.

Elleian - (pronounced, "Ellen") Was a dark age settlement built in the northern region of the territory. Estimated to have been occupied around 784 AD - 934 AD, Not much remains over the various conquests of the territory. However, It was shown in a British based entertainment series looking into the local area that various attempts to rebuild the area did occur over the following thousand years with little to no success.
 
The name of the village used by the locals is Kun.

Notable people 

Ante Gotovina, a retired Croatian general, was born and grew up in Tkon. He is an honorary citizen of Tkon.

Sport 

Tkon is the birthplace of Škraping, an international trekking race that includes running and orientation. The race has two categories: ultra and light.

Municipalities of Croatia
Populated places in Zadar County
Pašman